Living Proof is a 2008 Lifetime Television film, directed by Dan Ireland. The film stars Harry Connick, Jr. as Dr. Dennis Slamon, a doctor who is trying to find a cure for breast cancer. The film also stars Paula Cale, Angie Harmon and Amanda Bynes in supporting roles.

Plot
The film follows the true story of Dr. Dennis Slamon (played by Harry Connick, Jr.), who helped develop the breast cancer drug Herceptin, over the course of 8 years from 1988 to 1996. Dr. Slamon is a physician scientist at UCLA Medical Center (Los Angeles), where he has developed the experimental drug Herceptin, which he believes will become a treatment for breast cancer. However, when the drug company stops funding the research, philanthropists, including Lilly Tartikoff (Angie Harmon) and Ronald Perelman help him continue drug research. Funding was done with an initial donation from Perelman's Revlon charity, and continued over the years with the "Fire and Ice Ball" organized by Tartikoff.

Eventually the drug company funds the research and the drug goes through three trials before gaining approval from the FDA (Food and Drug Administration). Prior to the trials, the drug undergoes a preclinical animal trial. Nicole (Tammy Blanchard), a young mother with stage 4 cancer, receives the drug first. Although her mother Elizabeth (Swoosie Kurtz) pleads with Dr. Slamon, Nicole is not included in the subsequent trials as she does not meet the trial requirements. The women in the trials, particularly the first trial, band together. They handle their disease and drug trial, with humor—Tish (Jennifer Coolidge), or with alternative therapy—Tina (Trudie Styler). The stories of Barbara (Bernadette Peters) and Ellie (Regina King) are followed throughout, as they go through the trials and eventual recovery. Some patients involved in the tests die, but ultimately Slamon's work with the drug changes the course of breast cancer treatment.

Cast
Harry Connick, Jr. as Dr. Dennis Slamon
Paula Cale as Donna Slamon, Dr. Slamon's wife
Angie Harmon as Lilly Tartikoff, wife of Brandon Tartikoff (NBC Television president)
Amanda Bynes as Jamie McGrath, Dr. Slamon's student assistant
Bernadette Peters as Barbara Bradfield, a retired art teacher and the first woman the drug trial saved by Herceptin
Regina King as Ellie Jackson, a fashion designer and breast cancer survivor
John Benjamin Hickey as Blake Rogers, Dr. Slamon's friend and fellow scientist
Swoosie Kurtz as Elizabeth Aldridge, Nicole's mother
Melissa McBride as Sally
Tammy Blanchard as Nicole Wilson, the first woman to receive Herceptin
Amy Madigan as Fran Visco, President of the National Breast Cancer Coalition
Trudie Styler as Tina, participant in Phase One of the Her2 study
Jennifer Coolidge as Tish, participant in Phase One of the Her2 study
Bruce McKinnon as Dean Bradfield, Barbara Bradfield's loving husband
Lance E. Nichols as Dr. Brown, Barbara's physician
Rhoda Griffis as Bindy Hawn, a member of the Revlon charity board
William Ragsdale as Andy Marks

Note: the women patients portrayed are composites with the exception of Barbara Bradfield.

Soundtrack 
Harry Connick, Jr. has written "Song for the Hopeful". The song is also part of Connick's album What a Night! A Christmas Album, which is to be released in November 2008. Sony has announced it will give a contribution to breast cancer charities, for each download of "Song for the Hopeful" (Theme from "Living Proof") from iTunes, where it was released on October 7, 2008.

Production 
Teleplay writer Vivienne Radkoff had the story for about seven years before it was completed. It is an adaptation of Robert Bazell's book HER-2: The Making of Herceptin, a Revolutionary Treatment for Breast Cancer. The film was the first mainstream feature film to be scored as a solo project by composer Halli Cauthery.

Renée Zellweger, in her first television project, is executive producer, with Neil Meron and Craig Zadan producers. Zellweger has produced one film prior to this, Miss Potter (2006). Zellweger suggested casting Harry Connick, Jr. for the film. They had acted together in the romantic comedy New in Town.

Filming of Living Proof took place in New Orleans, Louisiana in 2008. The filming location was suggested by Connick, because, he said: "It's expensive to film in Los Angeles, and my being from New Orleans, it's a chance to help the city get back on its feet a little bit by employing a lot of the local people."

Release

Release 
The film premiered on October 18, 2008, for Lifetime's "Stop Breast Cancer for Life" public service and advocacy campaign, during the National Breast Cancer Awareness Month. The movie averaged 2.5 million viewers in its debut on October 18, 2008.

A red carpet premiere evening screening took place in New York on September 24, 2008, with a reception following with Harry Connick, Jr. and Bernadette Peters performing. Subsequent screenings took place in Washington, D.C. (September 25), Los Angeles (October 7), and London (October 9).

Critical reception 
Variety wrote: "Earnest, emotional and cast to the hilt with cameos for actresses, "Living Proof" rises above most Lifetime movie fare...There's also some nice camaraderie among the women patients, who are introduced as the song "Say a Little Prayer" appropriately plays in the background. It's that sort of movie – one without much use for subtlety – but the theme and execution should resonate strongly with those who tune in, helping promote the network's "Stop Breast Cancer for Life" public-awareness campaign.Lifetime movies often get a bad rap...but every , they genuinely do some good by doing well."

The Denver Post critic wrote:"A stunning lineup of talented actresses combines with a lively script to distinguish what might have been a fairly ordinary disease movie on Lifetime this weekend. A based-on-truth testament to perseverance and essential human goodness, the film offers proof that determined individuals can win the fight against huge, heartless drug companies."

The USA Today critic wrote:"'Living Proof' knows its target audience, though, and appeals to it with an earnestness made more engaging by a string of winning performances. Connick sustains the breezy charm he has shown as an actor and musician, but also shows a decided urgency in tracing Slamon's often frustrating, sometimes desperate struggle to get the support and funds required for his work...The women who take part in those trials are presented as a motley sorority and portrayed with a decided lack of vanity. Glamorous gals such as Bernadette Peters, Trudie Styler and Tammy Blanchard turn up looking weary and strained but also evoke the humor and resilience of their characters...Swoosie Kurtz and Regina King add extra sass as, respectively, Blanchard's mother and another young woman who survives cancer only to see it return in a more aggressive form."

References

External links
 
 Streaming video of Living Proof at MyLifetime.com (not available for European residents)
Variety article, "Hosts set for third annual Fire & Ice Ball", November 18, 1992

2008 television films
2008 films
Breast cancer
Films based on non-fiction books
Films directed by Dan Ireland
Films shot in New Orleans
Lifetime (TV network) films
Films about cancer
2000s English-language films